Lake Washington is a lake in Le Sueur County, Minnesota and Blue Earth County, Minnesota, in the United States. The lake has a regional park, located on the northwest shore, which was acquired in two phases in 1971 and 1978. The park serves as a campgrounds area. The first structure on the lake was built in 1898. The lake has a summer camp for children on the lake, Camp Patterson, which hosts an average of 2,500 kids throughout the summer.

Lake Washington was named for President George Washington.

See also
List of lakes in Minnesota

References

Lakes of Minnesota
Lakes of Blue Earth County, Minnesota
Lakes of Le Sueur County, Minnesota